José Ricardo Duno (born 1977-03-19 in San Félix) is a Venezuelan football midfielder who made a total number of 12 appearances for the Venezuela national team between 1999 and 2000. He started his professional career at Nueva Cadiz Cumana.

References
 
 

1977 births
Living people
Venezuelan footballers
Venezuela international footballers
Association football midfielders
1999 Copa América players
Deportivo Táchira F.C. players
A.C.C.D. Mineros de Guayana players
Deportivo Anzoátegui players
20th-century Venezuelan people
21st-century Venezuelan people